The 2018 NCAA men's water polo rankings is a human poll designated to rank the top 20 men's college water polo programs at the NCAA Division I, II, and III levels.. The official rankings recognized by the National Collegiate Athletic Association (NCAA) are determined by the Collegiate Water Polo Association (CWPA), and have released rankings for this competition since 2008. The rankings are updated weekly at the beginning of the season and finalized at the conclusion of the 2018 NCAA Men's Water Polo Championship.

Legend

CWPA Poll

References

December 2018 sports events in the United States
 
NCAA